"Krusty Gets Kancelled" is the twenty-second and final episode of the fourth season of the American animated television series The Simpsons. It first aired on the Fox network in the United States on May 13, 1993. In the episode, a new show featuring ventriloquist Arthur Crandall and his dummy Gabbo premieres in Springfield and competes with Krusty the Clown's show. Krusty's show is soon cancelled. Bart and Lisa decide to help Krusty get back on the air by staging a comeback special.

The episode was written by John Swartzwelder, and directed by David Silverman. Following the success of "Homer at the Bat", the writers wanted to try a similar guest star-heavy episode, except with celebrities instead of baseball players. The episode proved quite difficult, as many of the actors asked to guest star declined at the last minute and the comeback special portion was nearly scrapped. Johnny Carson, Hugh Hefner, Bette Midler, Luke Perry, and the Red Hot Chili Peppers (Flea, Anthony Kiedis, Arik Marshall and Chad Smith) all guest star as themselves and appear on Krusty's special. Elizabeth Taylor and Barry White, both of whom guest-starred in previous episodes this season, make cameo appearances.

Plot
One afternoon while watching television, Homer and Bart see a commercial for something named "Gabbo"; this is the start of a viral marketing campaign, with the whole of Springfield unsure what "Gabbo" actually is. Finally, "Gabbo" is revealed to be a ventriloquist's dummy. Ventriloquist Arthur Crandall announces that Gabbo's new children's program will air in direct competition with the established Krusty the Klown Show each afternoon at 4 p.m., and Gabbo's catchphrase — "I'm a bad widdle boy" — instantly charms his intended audience. At first, Krusty is unimpressed by Gabbo and vows to fight back, but quickly pales to Gabbo's clever tactics and great reviews. Krusty even tries to use a dummy of his own, but its gruesome appearance and poor condition scare off many of the children in the audience. To make matters worse, Itchy and Scratchy have moved to Gabbo's show, forcing Krusty to instead show an obscure Cold War-era Eastern European Communist cartoon entitled "Worker and Parasite", before his ratings hit rock-bottom and his show is eventually cancelled.

Left without work and having no nest egg (something referenced in "Krusty Gets Busted" by his ex-sidekick, Sideshow Bob), Krusty falls on hard times and begins suffering from depression. Meanwhile, Bart and Lisa, who had disliked Gabbo from the start, decide to try to help Krusty. Bart sneaks into the studio and secretly records Gabbo referring to children of Springfield as "SOBs", which damages his reputation.  After visiting Krusty and seeing photos of him with a series of celebrity friends, Bart and Lisa suggest that he host a comeback special. They begin recruiting major celebrities to appear on Krusty's special: Bette Midler, Johnny Carson, the Red Hot Chili Peppers, Hugh Hefner, and his half-brother Luke Perry. They also try to recruit Elizabeth Taylor, but her agent declines the invitation before they can speak to her. Bart and Lisa then help Krusty get back into shape before the special airs; this is necessary because, for health, he has been drinking a lot of milkshakes, not knowing that they should have been diet milkshakes. Krusty tries to tempt his former partner Sideshow Mel, who is now working in a fast food restaurant, into rejoining for the comeback special, but Mel declines because of all the physical abuse that Krusty has subjected him to.

Krusty's comeback special features his surprise reunion with Sideshow Mel, Perry getting shot out of a cannon, the Red Hot Chili Peppers singing "Give It Away" in their underwear, Carson lifting a 1987 Buick Skylark over his head, Hefner playing "Peter and the Wolf" on a glass harp, and Krusty and Midler singing "Wind Beneath My Wings". The show is a great success and Krusty's career gets back on track. While watching the special at home, Taylor remarks to herself that she should fire her agent. Afterwards, everyone heads to Moe's Tavern for an after party, where they toast Krusty and watch Carson as he plays the accordion while balancing Grampa and Jasper on a bench on his head.

Production

The episode was written by John Swartzwelder and directed by David Silverman. The idea of The Krusty the Clown Show being canceled was pitched by writer John Swartzwelder. The rest of the writers decided this would be an opportunity to include a group of celebrity guest stars. They had done a similar episode the year before called "Homer at the Bat" (which starred nine Major League Baseball players) and had hoped to emulate its success. At that point, the writers had a list of celebrities who had wanted to do a guest spot on the show and decided to use this episode to burn through some of them. However, the episode was described by executive producer Mike Reiss as "a nightmare" because several guests pulled out at the last minute and the script had to be changed several times. One of the goals for the episode was to have an ex-President of the United States. They wrote "very respectful but cute" parts for each then-living ex-president (Richard Nixon, Gerald Ford, Jimmy Carter, and Ronald Reagan) at the time, but they all turned them down. Only the latter responded, sending a politely worded reply.

All of the guest stars were recorded over a period of several months. One of the writers' goals was to get a musical act to appear, but several performers, including The Rolling Stones and Wynonna Judd, turned the role down (although Rolling Stones members Keith Richards and Mick Jagger did eventually appear in season 14's "How I Spent My Strummer Vacation"). The Red Hot Chili Peppers finally accepted, and were directed by George Meyer, who told them to ad-lib many of their lines. The celebrity aspect of the episode was almost canceled because the producers were unable to get an obligation before the record deadline. Johnny Carson appears in the episode, and it was one of the few televised appearances he made after he retired from The Tonight Show. He recorded his lines the night after the 44th Primetime Emmy Awards. The original role pitched for Carson was one where he visited the Simpson family's house and mooched off them. Carson felt this role was too degrading, so instead the writers took the opposite route and portrayed him as extremely versatile and multi-talented. Bette Midler's condition for guest-starring was that the show promoted her anti-littering campaign. Elizabeth Taylor guest-starred as herself and also recorded a part as Maggie in "Lisa's First Word" on the same day. Luke Perry was one of the first guest stars to agree to their parts. Voice actors Julie Kavner and Harry Shearer both strongly objected to the celebrity cameos in the episode, considering it tasteless, which led to Kavner boycotting it entirely; as a result, this is the only episode of the series to date in which Marge does not have any speaking parts despite her prominence.

The short cartoon "Worker and Parasite" is a reference to Soviet cartoons, and Soviet propaganda venerating the working class against those considered a drain on society. To produce the animation, director David Silverman xeroxed several drawings and made the animation very jerky. The scene where Krusty sings "Send in the Clowns" was very tricky for the animators because it involves two shots of the same scene from different angles. Parts of the scene were animated by Brad Bird.

Cultural references
Frank Sinatra's 1973 rendition of the song "Send in the Clowns" from Ol' Blue Eyes Is Back is parodied in the episode, and Krusty sings the altered lyrics: "Send in those soulful and doleful, schmaltz-by-the-bowlful clowns" in a musical number of his comeback special. Gabbo's name comes from the 1929 film The Great Gabbo. He was originally designed to be more square, but the second design was made to be "a demented Howdy Doody". His voice was based on Jerry Lewis. Gabbo's on-air gaffe is based on a widespread urban legend claiming that the host of a children's radio or television program, often identified as Uncle Don, made a derogatory comment about the child audience at the end of a show without realizing that he was still on the air. The sequence with Gabbo's song contains several references to the 1940 film Pinocchio. Krusty mentions that he beat Joey Bishop. Bishop was an entertainer who had his own show, The Joey Bishop Show, which ran opposite of The Tonight Show Starring Johnny Carson. Bette Midler's serenading Krusty is a reference to the way Bette sang to Johnny Carson on the penultimate episode of Carson's show. The scene in which Krusty instructs the Red Hot Chili Peppers to change the lyrics to the song "Give It Away" is a reference to Ed Sullivan instructing The Doors to change the lyrics to the song "Light My Fire". The poses of the Red Hot Chili Peppers in the scene are based on the movie The Doors. Flea, the bassist of the Red Hot Chili Peppers, is incongruously seen playing a guitar during the performance of "Give It Away". Several scenes in Krusty's special are based on Elvis Presley's '68 Comeback Special. The musical piece that Hugh Hefner plays on the wine glasses is from Peter and the Wolf and was composed by Sergei Prokofiev.

Reception

In its original broadcast, "Krusty Gets Kancelled" finished 24th in ratings for the week of May 10–16, 1993, with a Nielsen rating of 12.3, equivalent to approximately 11.5 million viewing households. It was the highest-rated show on the Fox network that week, beating Married... with Children.

In 1997, TV Guide named "Krusty Gets Kancelled" as the second greatest Simpsons episode and the 66th greatest TV episode. In 1998, TV Guide listed it in its list of top twelve episodes, stating "Simpsons fans get a star-packed keeper that in its own twisted way reflects the pure faith and goodness at the heart of every classic children's tale." In 2006, Bette Midler, Hugh Hefner, Johnny Carson, Luke Perry, and the Red Hot Chili Peppers were listed at number four on IGN's list of the best Simpsons guest stars. They all also appeared on AOL's list of their favorite 25 Simpsons guest stars. In 2007, Vanity Fair named "Krusty Gets Kancelled" as the ninth-best episode of The Simpsons. John Ortved felt, "This is Krusty's best episode—better than the reunion with his father, or the Bar Mitzvah episode, which won an Emmy much later on. The incorporation of guest stars as themselves is top-notch, and we get to see the really dark side of Krusty's flailing showbiz career. Hollywood, television, celebrities, and fans are all beautifully skewered here." Brien Murphy of the Abilene Reporter-News classed "Krusty Gets Kancelled" as one of his three favorite episodes of The Simpsons, along with "Behind the Laughter" and "The Simpsons Spin-Off Showcase". Though Jim Schembri of The Age put the episode among his top 10 episodes of the series, he also noted "Unfortunately, this signaled the beginning of the show's obsession with star cameos." An article in the Herald Sun placed "Krusty Gets Kancelled" among the top 20 episodes of The Simpsons, and characterized "The sight of Krusty's feeble attempt to fight back with his own gruesome ventriloquist doll, which falls apart on his lap on air" as the highlight of the episode.  In 2009, it was named the 24th Greatest TV Episode of All-Time.

In an article about the 2003 DVD release in The Independent, "Krusty Gets Kancelled" was highlighted along with episodes "When You Dish Upon a Star", "Lisa the Iconoclast", "Dog of Death", "Homer Badman", and "Grampa vs. Sexual Inadequacy". In a 2004 review of the release of The Simpsons season four on DVD, Andrew Pulver of The Guardian highlighted episodes "Kamp Krusty" and "Krusty Gets Kancelled" as part of "TV art at its peak". Mike Clark of USA Today also highlighted "Kamp Krusty" and "Krusty Gets Kancelled" as better episodes of the season, along with "A Streetcar Named Marge" and "Lisa the Beauty Queen". Jen Chaney of The Washington Post described episodes "A Streetcar Named Marge", "Mr. Plow", "Marge vs. the Monorail", and "Krusty Gets Kancelled" as "gems" of The Simpsons' fourth season. Spence Kettlewell of The Toronto Star described season 4 episodes "Krusty Gets Kancelled", "Kamp Krusty", "Mr. Plow", and "I Love Lisa" as "some of the best episodes" of the series. Forrest Hartman of the Reno Gazette-Journal wrote that the large number of celebrity appearances detracted from the episode, commenting: "The result is a boring hodgepodge of scenes with Bette Midler, Johnny Carson, the Red Hot Chili Peppers and more where we're supposed to laugh simply because famous people are interacting with Krusty." The episode is one of co-executive producer Tim Long's three favorites, including "The Itchy & Scratchy & Poochie Show" and "A Milhouse Divided".

In 2000, the episode was released as part of a Twentieth Century Fox boxed set The Simpsons Go Hollywood, commemorating The Simpsons' 10th anniversary. The set included "some of the series' best spoofs of movies and TV", and also included episodes "Marge vs. the Monorail", "A Streetcar Named Marge", "Who Shot Mr. Burns?", parts one and two, and "Bart Gets Famous". The episode was included in a 2003 release of The Simpsons Classics on DVD by 20th Century Fox Home Entertainment.

In popular media
In the 2017 film Diary of a Wimpy Kid: The Long Haul, while Greg and Rodrick were at the convention center, Manny is watching the scene where Luke Perry gets shot out of a cannon from "Krusty Gets Kancelled".

References

External links

The Simpsons (season 4) episodes
1993 American television episodes
Red Hot Chili Peppers
Television shows written by John Swartzwelder
Cultural depictions of Hugh Hefner
Television episodes about television
Television episodes about termination of employment